Dawn Bohulano Mabalon (August 17, 1972 – August 10, 2018) was an American academic who worked on documenting the history of Filipino Americans. Mabalon was born in Stockton, and earned her doctoral degree from Stanford University; she later taught at San Francisco State University.  Mabalon was the co-founder of The Little Manila Foundation, which worked to preserve Little Manila in Stockton, California. During her life, her work elevated the topic of the history of Filipino Americans, in Central California in particular.

Early life and education
Mabalon was born on August 17, 1972, in Stockton, California to Filipinos who had immigrated to the United States from the Philippines; her father was a guerrilla during the Japanese occupation of the Philippines. Mabalon's grandfather, Pablo "Ambo" Mabalon, ran the Lafayette Lunch Counter, an important hub in the community and one of the longest surviving Filipino American businesses in Little Manila. Many Filipinos frequented the restaurant, including Carlos Bulosan. It remained in business until 1983, and the building it had occupied was torn down in 1999. Mabalon's maternal grandmother, Concepcion Moreno Bohulano, was the first school teacher of Filipina descent in the United States. Mabalon was also the niece of Fred and Dorothy Cordova; who were involved in the founding of the Filipino American National Historical Society.

During high school, Mabalon was involved in extracurricular activities, including leading her high school's Asian Club, student council, and editor of Hi-Lite. In 1991, Malabon was involved in a January issue of Sassy, being described as a "editor-in-chief". Graduating from Edison High School, her post-secondary education involved attending San Joaquin Delta College, University of California, Los Angeles (UCLA), and earning her doctorate at Stanford University. Mabalon's master's thesis was titled "Filipina Pioneers: The Pinay in Stockton, California, 1929–1946", and was written at UCLA in 1997. Mabalon's doctoral dissertation was titled Life in Little Manila Filipinas/os in Stockton, California, 1917–1972, and published in 2003.

During her time at UCLA, Mabalon was active in the Filipino community on campus. She endorsed the effort to keep Tagalog as an available language taught at the university.

Career
In 1999, Mabalon and Dillon Delvo co-founded The Little Manila Foundation in order to preserve what remained of the Little Manila neighborhood of Stockton, California.

In 2004, Mabalon became a faculty member at San Francisco State University; she was an associate professor of history. She focused her work on the history of Filipino Americans, Filipinos in Stockton, and Filipinos role in the 20th century labor movement. In particular, she highlighted the often overlooked efforts of Filipino Americans in the 20th Century farm labor movement, which has been seen as primarily a Mexican American movement led by Cesar Chavez. Mabalon was also on the board of trustees of the Filipino American National Historical Society.

In 2010, photographs taken by Mabalon were published on SFGate about a Filipino American band Skyflakes. In 2015, Mabalon was interviewed about the November 2015 Paris attacks by Voice of America, as she and her husband were visiting the area at the time. In 2017, Mabalon, along with Gayle Romasanta, wrote a children's book about Larry Itliong called Journey for Justice: The Life of Larry Itliong; the book was published a year later. In 2018, Mabalon visited the Delano campus of Bakersfield College, which is in the area where the Delano grape strike began, for an event about archiving; at the event she spoke to encourage Filipino Americans to preserve their family histories, with the goal of expanding historical narratives.

Honors and awards
In 2013, the Filipino Women's Network listed her among their "100 Most Influential Filipinas in the World". In 2014, she received an honorable mention for the Frederick Jackson Turner Award for her book Little Manila Is in the Heart; that same year Mabalon was profiled in the book Remarkable Women of Stockton.

Death
In August 2018, Mabalon died while snorkeling off of Kauai. She had been vacationing with her family prior to her death. Mabalon had an asthma attack when she was out with her sister, and her inhaler did not alleviate her symptoms. She was brought out of the water and 9-1-1 was called. Paramedics attempted CPR and then transported her to an emergency room. She died at the hospital. Mabalon was buried at San Joaquin Catholic Cemetery. Mabalon was survived by her husband of ten years, Jesus Perez Gonzalez. In early October, Mabalon was memorialized at San Francisco State University.

Legacy
Mabalon's work of documenting the history of Filipino Americans continued at the Little Manila Center that she had co-founded even after her death . Mabalon authored three books and was working on a fourth. Her works elevated the status of Little Manila in Stockton and helped lead to Little Manila being listed as one of America's Most Endangered Places. The San Francisco Chronicle described Mabalon as "a major figure to California's Filipino Americans".

Bibliography

References

External links

1972 births
2018 deaths
Accidental deaths in Hawaii
Respiratory disease deaths in Hawaii
American women writers
American writers of Filipino descent
Deaths from asthma
Historians of the United States
San Francisco State University faculty
Stanford University alumni
Writers from Stockton, California
21st-century American women